Pulak Sengupta (born 1963) is an Indian petrologist and a professor and former head of the Department of Geological Sciences of Jadavpur University. He is known for his studies on grain-scale reaction mechanism and ultra-high temperature regional scale metamorphism and his studies have been documented in several peer-reviewed articles; ResearchGate and Google Scholar, online repositories of scientific articles, have listed 31 and 60 of them respectively. Besides, he has contributed chapters to many books published by others. He has also mentored doctoral scholars in their studies.

Sengupta, born on 5 December 1963 in the Indian state of West Bengal did his master's studies at Jadavpur University and subsequently secured a PhD from the same institution before joining his alma mater as a member of faculty. He is an elected fellow of Indian Academy of Sciences, and the Indian National Science Academy. The Council of Scientific and Industrial Research, the apex agency of the Government of India for scientific research, awarded him the Shanti Swarup Bhatnagar Prize for Science and Technology, one of the highest Indian science awards for his contributions to Earth, Atmosphere, Ocean and Planetary Sciences in 2006. Apart from academics his interests include photography and travelling.

Selected bibliography

Chapters in books

Articles

See also 
 Deformation mechanism

Notes

References

External links 
 

Recipients of the Shanti Swarup Bhatnagar Award in Earth, Atmosphere, Ocean & Planetary Sciences
1963 births
Indian scientific authors
Indian geologists
Jadavpur University alumni
Academic staff of Jadavpur University
Scientists from Kolkata
Fellows of the Indian Academy of Sciences
Fellows of the Indian National Science Academy
Petrologists
Living people
20th-century Indian earth scientists